21st Division  or 21st Infantry Division may refer to:

Infantry divisions 
 21st Infantry Division (France)
 21st Division (German Empire)
 21st Reserve Division (German Empire)
 21st Infantry Division (Wehrmacht)
 21st Waffen Mountain Division of the SS Skanderbeg, Germany
 21st Infantry Division (India)
 21st Infantry Division Granatieri di Sardegna, Kingdom of Italy
 21st Infantry Division (India)
 21st Division (Imperial Japanese Army)
 21st Mountain Infantry Division (Poland)
 21st Division (South Vietnam)
 21st Division (Spain)
 21st Division (United Kingdom)
 21st Infantry Division (Iran)
21st Division (People's Republic of China)

Cavalry divisions 

 21st Cavalry Division (United States)

Armoured divisions 
 21st Panzer Division (Wehrmacht), Germany

Aviation divisions 
 21st Air Division (United States)

See also
 21st Brigade (disambiguation)
 21st Regiment (disambiguation)